ABCs is the first official single by rapper K'naan on his album Troubadour. It also features rapper Chubb Rock and is produced by A&M/Octone Records. The song was also featured on the soundtrack for the video game Madden 09 and in both the film and the trailer for The Trotsky. The song can be heard in the films Step Up 3D (2010) and The Roommate (2011). It samples Chubb Rock's "Treat 'Em Right" and Mulatu Astatke's "Kasalefkut hulu."

Music video
The video was directed by Marcus Raboy and was filmed at the Brooklyn Bridge and Williamsburg, Brooklyn, New York. It begins with K'naan walking across the bridge and he buys a vinyl record at the Pass Out Records store. While K'naan is walking along a street, Chubb Rock drives up in a 1965 Pontiac Catalina with two large speakers in the back, picks up K'naan, they go to a party. K'naan then walks along a street, under an elevated Subway. America's Best Dance Crew Season 2 Champions Super Cr3w make an appearance.

Chart positions
"ABCs" debuted at #75 on the Canadian Hot 100 on the issue of March 3, 2009, based on downloads.

References 

2008 singles
2008 songs
K'naan songs
A&M Octone Records singles
Music videos directed by Marcus Raboy
Songs written by Gerald Eaton
Songs written by K'naan
Songs written by Brian West (musician)
Canadian hip hop songs